, formally called , is a Buddhist temple located in the city of Kashiwa in Chiba Prefecture, Japan.

History
In the year 807, Emperor Saga requested Kūkai to found this temple.

Religious organizations established in the 8th century
Buddhist temples in Chiba Prefecture